Doctors is a British medical soap opera which began broadcasting on BBC One on 26 March 2000. Set in the fictional Midlands town of Letherbridge, defined as being in the city of Birmingham, the soap follows the lives of the staff of both a NHS Doctor's surgery and a University Campus Surgery, as well as their families and friends. The series has been nominated for and won a variety of different awards.

In 2003, Doctors was nominated for Best British Soap at The British Soap Awards for the first time, where it has been nominated annually since. The next year, Doctors won their first award at the British Soap Awards, when they won Best Single Episode for "Say A Little Prayer". At the 2009 British Soap Awards, Vivien's (Anita Carey) rape plot won the award for Best Storyline; Carey also won the award for Best Female Dramatic Performance for her involvement in the storyline. The storyline was nominated again at the 2018 ceremony in the category of Greatest Moment. Also at the 2018 British Soap Awards, Doctors won a shared award with fellow BBC soap EastEnders. Both soaps won the award for Scene of the Year; this marked the first time two soaps have won a singular award.

Since 2018, Doctors has been nominated for Best Daytime Soap at the Digital Spy Reader Awards; it won for the first time in 2022, ending Neighbours five-year winning streak. It is also nominated annually at the Inside Soap Awards. Lorna Laidlaw won the award for Best Daytime Star for her role as Mrs Tembe in 2017, while the soap itself won Best Daytime Soap the following year. The soap also receives annual longlist nominations from the National Television Awards, with Elisabeth Dermot Walsh having received two nominations for her role as Zara Carmichael. At the RTS Midlands Awards, Dido Miles has won the award for Acting Performance of the Year for her portrayal of Emma Reid twice, in 2013 and 2017. Doctors has also won the Drama award three times at the ceremony. The Writers' Guild of Great Britain has also awarded the soap twice within the Best Long Running TV Series category.

Black International Film Festival and Music Video & Screen Awards
The Black International Film Festival and Music Video & Screen Awards is an annual award ceremony that honours the creative achievements of Black individuals.

British Academy Television Awards
The British Academy Television Awards is an annual award ceremony hosted by the BAFTA.

British Soap Awards
The British Soap Awards are an annual awards ceremony which honours the achievements in British soap operas, televised on ITV since 1999.

Digital Spy Reader Awards
The Digital Spy Reader Awards are an annual online award ceremony hosted by the website Digital Spy; the awards are voted for by readers of the website.

Inside Soap Awards
The Inside Soap Awards are an annual award ceremony hosted by Inside Soap, celebrating achievements in British soap operas.

National Television Awards
The National Television Awards are an annual award ceremony celebrating achievements in British television, broadcast on ITV.

Royal Television Society Awards
The Royal Television Society is a British-based educational charity for the discussion, and analysis of television who host both national awards, such as the programme awards and craft & design awards, as well as six regional awards annually, including the RTS Midlands Awards.

RTS Programme Awards

RTS Craft & Design Awards

RTS Midlands Awards

Screen Nation Film and Television Awards
The Screen Nation Film and Television Awards were an annual award ceremony devised to celebrate and award Black British and international film and television talent.

TV Choice Awards
The TV Choice Awards, awarded by TV Choice magazine, began in 1997 as the TV Quick Awards.

Writers' Guild of Great Britain Awards
The Writers' Guild of Great Britain Awards are an annual awards ceremony which honour writers' achievements.

Other awards

References

External links
 

Doctors (2000 TV series)
Doctors (2000 TV series) lists
Lists of awards by television series